Events from the year 1622 in Taiwan.

Incumbents

Events
 Dutch East India Company occupied Penghu.

Births

References

 
Years of the 17th century in Taiwan